OLAC, the Open Language Archives Community, is an initiative to create a unified means of searching online databases of language resources for linguistic research. The information about resources is stored in XML format for easy searching. OLAC was founded in 2000, and is hosted at the Linguistic Data Consortium webserver at the University of Pennsylvania.

OLAC advises on best practices in language archiving, and works to promote interoperation between language archives.

Metadata 
The OLAC metadata set is based on the complete set of Dublin Core metadata terms DCMT, but the format allows for the use of extensions to express community-specific qualifiers. It is often contrasted to IMDI (ISLE Metadata Initiative).

Attributes 
The OLAC metadata is based on five primary attributes, refine, code, scheme, lang, and langs, although the last attribute is only for completed metadata sets.  Each attribute serves a different function and is applicable in a different section of the metadata.

Elements 
There are currently 23 different elements that OLAC lists on its metadata page. Elements may be used more than once, and not every element is required in a metadata submission.  Each element's entry on the official OLAC page includes the name of the element, its function, notes on its usage, and examples of its coding.

In addition, OLAC provides a list of metadata extensions to augment descriptions.

References

External links
 Official website (and alternative server)
 Search OLAC

Linguistics organizations
Organizations established in 2000